Dimitar Gerdzhikov (born 27 March 1992) is a retired Bulgarian biathlete. He competed in the 2018 Winter Olympics, where he finished 81st in the sprint and 43rd in the individual and was part of the lapped relay, and in 2022 Winter Olympics. His best individual result was 21st place at the individual in 2019, and the best relay result was 7th place, achieved in the 2014/15 season. He is engaged to fellow biathlete Desislava Stoyanova, from whom he has one child

Biathlon results
All results are sourced from the International Biathlon Union.

World Championships
0 medals

*During Olympic seasons competitions are only held for those events not included in the Olympic program.
**The single mixed relay was added as an event in 2019.

References

1992 births
Living people
Bulgarian male biathletes
Biathletes at the 2018 Winter Olympics
Biathletes at the 2022 Winter Olympics
Olympic biathletes of Bulgaria
People from Smolyan
21st-century Bulgarian people